David Fig is a South African environmental sociologist, political economist, and activist. He holds a PhD from the London School of Economics, with his thesis titled, The political economy of South-South relations: The case of South Africa and Latin America, and specialises in questions of energy, trade, biodiversity, and corporate responsibility. His recent books include Staking their Claims: Corporate Social and Environmental Responsibility in South Africa (UKZN Press, 2007) and Uranium Road: Questioning South Africa's Nuclear Direction (Jacana, 2005), which was turned into a 53-minute documentary film in 2007.

Fig chairs the board of Biowatch South Africa, which is concerned with food security and sustainable agriculture, and works closely with various environmental justice non-government organizations. He has previously been executive director of the Group for Environmental Monitoring in Johannesburg, a senior lecturer in sociology at the University of the Witwatersrand, and a board member of South African National Parks.

See also
Anti-nuclear movement

References

Year of birth missing (living people)
Living people
South African sociologists
Environmental sociologists
South African anti–nuclear power activists
South African environmentalists
Sustainability advocates